KV (Kendriya Vidyalaya) No.1 Ahmednagar is a secondary school affiliated to CBSE board in Ahmednagar, Maharashtra, India. 
It is one of three KV's in Ahmednagar. It is a part of the Kendriya Vidyalaya Sangathan.

Location
The KV is located near the Ahmednagar Fort, situated in defense area. It is between Savedi and Bhingar making it an ideal school for people residing in the city area and army area. The area near school is green and quiet with no traffic honking. The atmosphere there makes it ideal for students to concentrate in their studies.

Facilities
The school is a single floor building with an open area for plenty of trees surrounding the school premises. The school has 34 classrooms; three science labs, one each for chemistry, physics, and biology; four subject rooms; three computer labs with Internet access; a library; and various activity rooms and sports facilities. The school is aided with Star Boards which are used for teaching students in a visual manner.

Faculty 
This school consists of 49 teachers.

History
The school was built in the year 1963 mainly for the children of defence personals who work in that area. Ahmednagar is a defense training place with many regiments. The school gives admissions for all students with first priority for Army then Central Govt. employees followed by State Govt. employees and then others.

Kendriya Vidyalaya Sangathan is an autonomous body set up by the Indian Ministry of Education. To cater to the educational needs of the children of defense personnel and other nearly residing civilians, K.V. No. 1 Ahmednagar is functioning with nearly 1300 students and 49 staff members.

School has divisions for the primary, secondary and senior secondary students. It is a co-educational institution, with classes I to X (3 sections each) and XI and XII (science & arts), affiliated to Central Board of Secondary Education (CBSE), New Delhi.

The school celebrated its golden jubilee in the year 2013.

Recently the school was ordered for renovation from KVS Regional Office Mumbai. The renovation work has been successfully completed. The renovation included new tiles, refurbishing the walls and roofs, painting, new roads, and many other things.

See also
 List of Kendriya Vidyalayas

References

External links
 Kendriya Vidyalaya No.1 website {Its official website of KV Ahmednagar}
 KVS official website {Its official link of KV Sanghtan, Here students can find guidelines for an admission}
 KV No 1 Ahmedanagar Admission {Its admission link, where students know about the admission process and all related things}

Schools in Maharashtra
Kendriya Vidyalayas
Education in Ahmednagar district